The Canada men's national intercrosse team is the intercrosse team representing Canada internationally, and a member of the  Fédération Internationale d'Inter-Crosse (FIIC). Canada until 2003 operated under the name Quebec. The team has competed in the annual Intercrosse World Championship several times starting in 1999. Canada did not participate in the 2005 Intercrosse World Championship and 2012 Intercrosse World Championship.

Tournament history

External links 
 FIIC official site
 History

See also
Intercrosse

Ice Hockey